Juan José is a Spanish given name. Some people with the name:

People
 Juan José Arbolí y Acaso (1795–1863), Spanish priest
 Juan José Alvarado (1798–1857), Honduran Supreme Director
 Juan José Alvear (born 1941), Spanish field hockey player
 Juan José Aranguren (born 1954), Argentine businessman
 Juan José Aramburu (born 1981), Spanish skeet shooter
 Juan José Albornoz (born 1982), Chilean football midfielder
 Juan José Arraya (born 1986), Argentine football striker
 Juan José Amador (born 1998), Colombian cyclist
 Juan José Florian (born  1982), Colombian para cyclist

See also
 Juan José (disambiguation)

Spanish masculine given names